, initially known under temporary designation Sar2667, was a metre-sized asteroid or meteoroid that entered Earth's atmosphere on 13 February 2023 02:59 UTC and disintegrated as a meteor over the coast of Normandy, France along the English Channel. It was discovered less than seven hours before impact, by Hungarian astronomer Krisztián Sárneczky at Konkoly Observatory's Piszkéstető Station in the Mátra Mountains, Hungary.  is the seventh asteroid discovered before impacting Earth and successfully predicted, and the third of those for which meteorites have been recovered. Before it impacted,  was a near-Earth asteroid on an Earth-crossing Apollo-type orbit.

Discovery 
At discovery, the asteroid had an apparent magnitude of 19.4 and moved quickly in the northern hemisphere sky, at an angular rate of 14 arcseconds per minute and a radial velocity of  towards Earth. Sárneczky immediately recognized it was a near-Earth object, but only realized it was on course for impact with Earth when he reobserved it half an hour later. Sárneczky gave the object the temporary designation Sar2667 and reported the discovery to the Minor Planet Center's (MPC's) Near-Earth Object Confirmation Page at 20:49 UTC, calling for further follow-up from other observatories around the world. Astronomers at Višnjan Observatory in Tičan, Croatia observed the asteroid starting at 21:03 UTC and confirmed that it was headed for impact with Earth.

The European Space Agency took notice of the asteroid's impending impact and alerted the public through social media. Astronomers around the world continuously observed the asteroid to refine its trajectory  as it approached Earth and its impact location. The asteroid reached a peak brightness of magnitude 13 (about the brightness of Pluto) right before it entered Earth's shadow at around 02:50 UTC. It then faded dramatically and became invisible until impact. The asteroid was last observed on 13 February 2023 02:52:07 UTC by the SATINO Remote Observatory in Haute Provence, France, just two minutes after it entered Earth's shadow and seven minutes before it impacted.

On 13 February 2023 04:13 UTC (one hour after the impact), the object received from the MPC the official minor planet provisional designation . At least 20 observatories observed  and submitted astrometry to the MPC before impact, with over 300 astrometric positions recorded in total.

Impact 

At 02:59:21 UTC (local time 03:59:21 a.m. The meteor was seen by witnesses from France, Great Britain, Belgium, Netherlands, and Germany. In the process, the meteor released a great amount of kinetic energy. That produced a shock wave, which was heard by some witnesses and was detected by French seismographs. Over 80 witness reports of the meteor were submitted to the International Meteor Organization (IMO).

Upon breakup,  dropped meteorites over the Normandy region and produced a strewn field spanning from Dieppe to Doudeville. Guided by Peter Jenniskens, researchers and citizen scientists of the Fireball Recovery and Interplanetary Observation Network immediately began a coordinated search effort in the expected meteorite fall area. On 15 February 2023 15:47 UTC (local time 4:47 p.m. By March 2023, over 20 additional meteorites were recovered, with masses ranging . The IMO estimates that  could have dropped only one large meteorite up to ~ in mass, plus an uncertain number of smaller meteorites up to several tens of grams each. The largest meteorite is expected to have landed near the commune of Vénestanville. 

 is the seventh asteroid discovered before being successfully predicted to impact Earth, and also the third whose meteorites were collected after its predicted impact. It is Sárneczky's second discovery of an impacting asteroid, after  which he discovered a year prior in March 2022.

Orbit 
Prior to impact,  was on an Apollo-type orbit that crossed the orbits of Earth and Mars. The orbit had a low inclination of 3.4° with respect to the ecliptic and an orbital period of 2.08 years. The asteroid last passed perihelion on 13 February 2021 and impacted Earth before it was set to make its next perihelion on 15 March 2023.

Before that,  had made several distant close approaches with Earth and Mars during the 1900s, though it probably never approached within  from these planets.

See also 
 Impact event
 Asteroid impact prediction
 , the sixth asteroid discovered before being successfully predicted to impact Earth
 Meteorite fall
 , the first asteroid to have its meteorites collected after its predicted impact with Earth
 2018 LA, the second asteroid to have its meteorites collected after its predicted impact with Earth

Notes

References

External links 
 
 
 
 Scout archive for Sar2667

20230212

Minor planet object articles (unnumbered)
Predicted impact events
February 2023 events